"Ni Tú Ni Ella" (Neither You Nor She) is a single by Salvadoran singer Álvaro Torres released on 1990 through EMI Latin as part of Torres' ninth studio album Si Estuvieras Conmigo. The song was written by Torres, produced by Bebu Silvetti and it was recorded in Rusk Sound Studios, Los Angeles. 

The song was a success in Latin America and the United States, peaking at number 3 in April 1990 on the Billboard Hot Latin Tracks chart.

Background 
"Ni Tú Ni Ella" is an mid-tempo latin pop song written by Álvaro Torres. The song tells the story of a man's indecision about choosing between his couple and his lover, not wanting any of the two to suffer.

Torres said that the inspiration of the song came from the coincidence of two female friends of him. When he was in Los Angeles he had two female friends in the extremes of the city, and he thought they would never meet because of the distance, but finally that situation happened and he had to face it.

Track listing

Personnel 
Credits adapted from Si Estuvieras Conmigo liner notes.

Vocals

 Álvaro Torres – lead vocals
Kenny O'Brien – backing vocals
Maria Del Rey – backing vocals
Michel Jimenez – backing vocals
Nina Swan – backing vocals

Musicians

 Bebu Silvetti – arrangements, conducting, piano, keyboards
José Peña – bass guitar
Ezra Kliger – coordination
Suzie Katayama – copyist
Grant Geissman – guitar
John Yoakum – tenor saxophone
Alan Kaplan – trombone
Charlie Davis – trumpet
Ramon Flores – trumpet

Production

 Bebu Silvetti – production
Elton Ahi – mixing
Eric Scheda – mixing
Boon Heng Tam – engineering assistance
Gustavo Borner – engineering assistance

Recording

 Recorded and mixed at Rusk Sound Studios, Los Angeles

Charts

Weekly charts

Year-end charts

Covers
Puerto Rican merengue band Zona Roja covered the song on their 1992 album Peligroso Sabor.... Their version peaked at #36 on the Hot Latin Songs chart.

References

External links
 Lyrics of this song at Musixmatch

1990 singles
Álvaro Torres songs
1992 singles
Songs written by Álvaro Torres
Song recordings produced by Bebu Silvetti
Merengue songs
1990 songs